Ferril is a surname. Notable people with the surname include:

John H. Ferril (1873–1945), American businessman and politician
Thomas Hornsby Ferril (1896–1988), American poet

See also
Ferri
Ferrill